The Mara People's Party (MPP) was a political party in Myanmar.

History
The party was established in 1990, and contested four seats in the 1990 general elections. It received 0.04% of the vote, winning one seat; U Yo Ok in Matupi 1.

The party was banned by the military government on 11 March 1992.

References

Defunct political parties in Myanmar
1990 establishments in Myanmar
Political parties established in 1990
1992 disestablishments in Myanmar
Political parties disestablished in 1992